Marta Rodriguez (born 1 December 1933) is a Colombian documentary filmmaker, producer, director, and writer. Rodriguez was married to Jorge Silva, who served as co-director on many of their projects. Her notable films include Chircales (1972), Campesinos (1975), and Nuestra voz de tierra, memoria y futuro (1982). Rodriguez's works focuses on the lives and experiences of Colombia's working class. Rodriguez is considered a pioneer of anthropological documentary filmmaking in Latin America.

Career 
Rodriguez has directed over eighteen films, written ten, and produced four in her career. Her films focus on the living and working conditions of the lower socio-economic working class of Colombia, with an emphasis on indigenous and native peoples.

Chircales 
Rodriguez's Chiracles, released in 1972, is a documentary film about a family of bricklayers living in Bogota, Colombia. Chiracles highlights the religious, social and political experiences of the Castaneda family to expose the exploitation faced by those of similar low class and social standing. Rodriguez directed this alongside her husband and frequent collaborator, Jorge Silva. Chiracles was filmed across a period of six years between 1966 and 1972.

Campesinos 
Campesinos is a 1975 documentary directed by Rodriguez centering on the Colombian indigenous farmers movement in the early years of the 1970s. Rodriguez once again collaborated with Silva to co-direct this film. Campesinos documents the injustices peasant workers endure working on coffee farms due to their indigenous cultural identities.

Nuestra voz de tierra, memoria y futuro. 
Nuestra voz de tierra, memoria y futuro is a 1982 documentary film directed by Rodriguez and Silva. Rodriguez focuses on the Coconuco indigenous community of Colombia in their struggle to maintain their culture and land in the face of encroaching developed civilization. Andean culture was eroding due to external pressure forcing the symbolic and literal eradication of a people trying to preserve their ways of life. Rodriguez highlights the myths, legends, and traditions important to Coconuco culture, and unfortunately at risk of erasure due to modernization.

Amor, mujeres y flores 
Amor, mujeres y flores is 1988 documentary film directed by Rodriguez and Silva. This film highlights the dangerous working conditions of women in the Colombian flower industry. Colombia is one of the main international suppliers of flowers to the United States, yet the environments in which thousands of Colombian women work are incredibly dangerous and hazardous to their health. The film emphasizes the detrimental effects of exposure to pesticide which several workers reveal have caused headaches, blindness, miscarriage and even cancer.

References 

1933 births
Living people